The 1945–46 French Rugby Union Championship of first division was won by Section Paloise (Pau) that beat Lourdes in the final.

The Championship was arranged in two groups. The first with 54 clubs divided in 9 pools of six (27 qualified) and the second of almost 100 clubs that qualified 5 club.

The 32 clubs were divided in 8 pools of 4 . the first two of esch were qualified two next round.

The 16 clubs are again divided in pools of 4 club . The winner of four pools are qualified for semifinals.

Context 

The "Coupe de France" was won by Toulose that beat Pau in the final.

Final

External links
 Compte rendu de la finale de 1946, sur lnr.fr

1946
France 1945
Championship